Sekken is an island in Molde Municipality, Møre og Romsdal county, Norway. The island is located in Romsdal Fjord, at the mouth of the Langfjorden. There are no road connections to the  island except for a ferry connection between the town of Molde and Seterneset on the island. The proposed Langfjord Tunnel includes a possible branch off the main tunnel under the Langfjorden that would connect Sekken to the mainland by subsea road tunnel.

See also
List of islands of Norway

References

External links
Sekken.net

Molde
Islands of Møre og Romsdal